Rathcoole is a parish in County Kilkenny. It does not give its name to any townland, but the first church there is believed to have been Teampall Ráth chúil. The parish consists of the following towlands:
 Agha 
 Carrigeen
 Cassagh
 Coolbrican (Coolbricken)
 Johnswell
 Knocknaguppoge
 Mountnugent Lower
 Mountnugent Upper
 Sandfordscourt
 Tullabrin (Tullowbrin)

References

County Kilkenny